Cho Young-hoon (born 13 April 1989) is a South Korean footballer who plays as a defender for FC Anyang in the K League 2.

Club career statistics

External links 

1989 births
Living people
Association football defenders
South Korean footballers
Daegu FC players
FC Anyang players
K League 1 players
K League 2 players
Dongguk University alumni